Scott Hamilton Kennedy (born 1965) is an Academy Award nominated documentary director, as well as a writer, producer, cameraman, and editor.  He is the founder of Black Valley Films, a film production company based in Silver Lake, California.

He is the son of the prominent New York criminal lawyer, Michael J. Kennedy.

Early career 
Kennedy graduated from Skidmore College and started his career in New York City.  He worked on a variety of television and film platforms including scripted and unscripted television, commercials, and music videos. Kennedy got his start by working with "low-budget legend Roger Corman to direct four TV features, each shot in six days." He also directed the Jimmy Cliff version of "I Can See Clearly Now" for the film Cool Runnings (1993).

Feature films

OT: Our Town 

Kennedy's first feature documentary is OT: Our Town, which follows Dominguez High School in Compton, California and their journey to attempt to put on Thornton Wilder’s play, Our Town. OT: Our Town screened at many film festivals, including: Toronto, Tribeca, and SXSW. It won awards at several festivals, like: Los Angeles for Best Documentary, Palm Springs International for the Audience Award, and Aspen FilmFest for the Audience Award. OT was nominated for an Independent Spirit Award and awarded a Human and Civil Rights award for the National Education Association (NEA). The film was a critical success, being praised by the L.A. Times and Seattle Times.

The Garden 

The Garden tells the story of the South Central Community Garden, which is the largest of its kind in the United States, and the complicated struggle it endured in order to survive. The film premiered at the AFI Silverdocs Film Festival, where it won Best Documentary, and eventually went on to win other awards at The Florida Film Festival, The Camden International Film Festival, and the MMPA Diversity Award. The Garden also earned a nomination for the 81st Academy Awards for Best Documentary. The film has received rave reviews from critics, like Kenneth Turan of the L.A. Times, quoted: “Excellent! Its lessons about the levers of power and politics, and how easy it is to get co-opted, are relevant everywhere. The Garden is a potent human drama.”

Fame High 

Kennedy's third feature documentary is Fame High, which centers around the Los Angeles County High School for Arts (LACHSA), and follows a group of freshmen and seniors through a school year as they strive to become successful actors, singers, dancers, and musicians. The film received exceptional reviews from the L.A. Times and N.Y. Times, and went on with a successful theatrical and digital release in 2013 before premiering on Showtime and Netflix in September 2013.

Food Evolution 

Food Evolution is Kennedy's latest documentary. Narrated by the well-respected astrophysicist and science communicator Neil deGrasse Tyson, Food Evolution highlights the importance of using the scientific method regarding the outlook on Genetically Modified Organisms, or GMO, foods. The film was well-received, but also controversial, in 2017. It earned a rare 100% on Rotten Tomatoes, and critics attested to it, with the L.A. Times writing: "Calm, careful, potentially revolutionary, Food Evolution is an iconoclastic documentary on a hot-button topic,” and the N.Y. Times saying: "Food Evolution posits an inconvenient truth for organic boosters to swallow: In a world desperate for safe, sustainable food, GMOs may well be a force for good." The film has been screened at the DC Environmental Film Festival, EU Parliament, UN Food and Agriculture Organization, and more.

Teaching 
Kennedy is also known as a public speaker and educator. He has taught master classes at prominent universities such as Carnegie Mellon, USC, and the Claremont Colleges. He participated in the American Documentary Showcase, a Cultural Presentation of the U.S. State Department. ADS partners with the local Embassy, bringing in filmmakers to show their work and teach in countries all over the world.

Filmography 
 2002: OT: Our Town (Director/Editor/Producer) 
 2003: Faking It (Director/Producer)
 2006: Livin' It Up With The Bratz (Director/Editor/Writer)
 2008: The Garden (Director/Editor/Producer/Writer)
 2011: Grace & Mercy (Editor)
 2012: Fame High (Director/Editor/Producer)
 2016: Food Evolution (Director/co-editor/co-writer/co-producer)

References

External links 
 

1965 births
Living people
American documentary filmmakers
American film producers
American male screenwriters